Agios Ioannis is a village of Lasithi prefecture, in the municipality of Ierapetra. It is built south of Thripti mountain in a site with  extensive views. The majority of the people that lived here, have moved during the last 3 decades to the beach (Koutsounari and Ferma settlements) and to Ierapetra. In the middle of the road towards Schinokapsala, you cross the forest of  "Psihro" hamlet with springs, platans, pine and other  trees. The water from the springs follows a route across "Milonas gorge" and ends to the sea some 7 kilometers further. In the Aghios Ioannis area there are also a number of beaches, including the Long beach and Aghia Fotia.

The larger community of Agios Ioannis is represented by a five-member Council headed by the Emmanouil Kidonakis. The community office is located in Koutsounari.

References 

Ierapetra
Populated places in Lasithi